The 2011 season was Bunyodkors 5th season in the Uzbek League, which the finished as champions for the 4th time. They also competed in the 2011 Uzbekistan Cup getting knocked out in the Semi-final stages by Nasaf Qarshi. The participated in the 2011 AFC Champions League, reaching the Last 16 stage before losing to Sepahan of Iran.

Squad

Out on loan

Technical Staff

Transfers

In

Loans in

Out

Loans out

Friendlies

Pre-season
During the winter break Bunyodkor went to a training camp in Turkey where club played 5 friendly matches.

Mid-season
Training match during FIFA official match days

Competitions

Uzbek League

League table

Results

Uzbek Cup

Results

AFC Champions League

Group stage

Knockout stage

Squad statistics

Appearances and goals

|-
|colspan="14"|Players away from Bunyodkor on loan:

|-
|colspan="14"|Players who left Bunyodkor during the season:

|}

Goal scorers

Disciplinary Record

References

Bunyodkor
Sport in Tashkent
FC Bunyodkor seasons